Alex the Great is a lost 1928 American silent comedy film directed by Dudley Murphy and starring Richard 'Skeets' Gallagher, Albert Conti and Patricia Avery.

Cast
 Richard 'Skeets' Gallagher as Alex the Great 
 Albert Conti as Ed 
 Patricia Avery as Muriel 
 Ruth Dwyer as Alice 
 Charles Byer as Brown 
 J. Barney Sherry as Smith

References

Bibliography
 Munden, Kenneth White. The American Film Institute Catalog of Motion Pictures Produced in the United States, Part 1. University of California Press, 1997.

External links
 

1928 films
1928 comedy films
1920s English-language films
American silent feature films
Silent American comedy films
American black-and-white films
Lost American films
Films directed by Dudley Murphy
Film Booking Offices of America films
1928 lost films
Lost comedy films
1920s American films